Robert Dale Price (September 7, 1927 – August 24, 2004) was an American politician of the Republican Party who served in the United States House of Representatives from 1967 to 1975, and in the Texas Senate from 1978 to 1981.

Born in Reading, Lyon County, Kansas; educated in the Reading public schools; B.S., Oklahoma State University, 1951; United States Air Force, 1951–1955; flew twenty-seven combat missions during the Korean conflict; awarded Air Medal; returned to Texas after honorable discharge in 1955; owned and operated a ranch in Texas; delegate, Texas State Republican conventions, 1964, 1966, and 1968; delegate, Republican National Convention, 1968; elected as a Republican to the Ninetieth and to the three succeeding Congresses (January 3, 1967 – January 3, 1975). While in Congress, Price served on the House Agriculture Committee and on subcommittees on NASA oversight and spaceflight.

In 1974, Price lost his re-election bid to Democrat Jack Hightower. After unsuccessfully running for his old U.S. House seat in 1976, Price won a 1977 special election for a Texas Senate seat, with the slogan "Price is right for Texas". Price served in the Texas Senate until losing his re-election bid in 1980 to Democrat Bill Sarpalius.

Price then had three unsuccessful runs for the U.S. House in 1988, 1990, and 1992. He died on August 24, 2004, in Pampa, Texas; interment in Fairview Cemetery in Midland, Texas.

References

 
 https://web.archive.org/web/20060822133633/http://www.capitol.state.tx.us/tlo/79R/billtext/HR00024F.HTM
 Congressional Quarterly's Guide to U.S. Elections, U.S. House
 http://www.tshaonline.org/handbook/online/articles/war02

External links
 

1927 births
2004 deaths
20th-century American politicians
Republican Party members of the United States House of Representatives from Texas
Republican Party Texas state senators
United States Air Force airmen
United States Air Force personnel of the Korean War
Recipients of the Air Medal
Ranchers from Texas
Baptists from Texas
People from Pampa, Texas
People from Lyon County, Kansas
Oklahoma State University alumni
20th-century Baptists